Goulburn, an electoral district of the Legislative Assembly in the Australian state of New South Wales, has had two incarnations, from 1859 until 1991 and from 2007 to the present.


Members for Goulburn

Election results

Elections in the 2010s

2019

2015

2011

Elections in the 2000s

2007

1991-2007
District abolished

Elections in the 1980s

1988

1984

1981

Elections in the 1970s

1978

1976

1974 by-election

1973

1971

Elections in the 1960s

1968

1965

1962

Elections in the 1950s

1959

1956

1953

1950

Elections in the 1940s

1947

1946 by-election

1944

1941

Elections in the 1930s

1938

1935

1932

1930

Elections in the 1920s

1927
This section is an excerpt from 1927 New South Wales state election § Goulburn

1926 appointment
John Perkins resigned to successfully contest the federal seat of Eden-Monaro at the 1926 Eden-Monaro by-election. Henry Bate was the next unsuccessful Nationalist candidate at the 1925 election and took his seat on 21 January 1926.

1925
This section is an excerpt from 1925 New South Wales state election § Goulburn

1922
This section is an excerpt from 1922 New South Wales state election § Goulburn

1921 appointment
William Millard died in October 1921. As there were no further unsuccessful Nationalist candidates, the Parliamentary Elections (Casual Vacancies) Act was amended to allow his replacement by another Nationalist supporter. John Perkins was appointed taking his seat on 22 November 1921.

1920 appointment
Gus James was appointed an Acting Judge of the Supreme Court of New South Wales from 21 September 1920. Between 1920 and 1927 the Legislative Assembly was elected using a form of proportional representation with multi-member seats and a single transferable vote (modified Hare-Clark). There was confusion at the time as to the process to be used to fill the vacancy. When George Beeby resigned on 9 August 1920, in accordance with the practice prior to 1920, the Speaker of the Legislative Assembly issued a writ of election requiring a by-election to be conducted, however the Chief Electoral Officer said he couldn't do so under then law at the time and that a by-election would be contrary to the principle of proportional representation. The vacancies were left unfilled until the Parliament passed the Parliamentary Elections (Casual Vacancies) Act on 10 December 1920, so that casual vacancies were filled by the next unsuccessful candidate on the incumbent member's party list.  William Millard was the only unsuccessful Nationalist candidate at the 1920 election and took his seat on 15 December 1920.

1920
This section is an excerpt from 1920 New South Wales state election § Goulburn

Elections in the 1910s

1917
This section is an excerpt from 1917 New South Wales state election § Goulburn

1913
This section is an excerpt from 1913 New South Wales state election § Goulburn

1910
This section is an excerpt from 1910 New South Wales state election § Goulburn

Elections in the 1900s

1907
This section is an excerpt from 1907 New South Wales state election § Goulburn

1904
This section is an excerpt from 1904 New South Wales state election § Goulburn

1901
This section is an excerpt from 1901 New South Wales state election § Goulburn

Elections in the 1890s

1898
This section is an excerpt from 1898 New South Wales colonial election § Goulburn

1895
This section is an excerpt from 1895 New South Wales colonial election § Goulburn

1894
This section is an excerpt from 1894 New South Wales colonial election § Goulburn

1891
This section is an excerpt from 1891 New South Wales colonial election § Goulburn

1890 by-election

Elections in the 1880s

1889
This section is an excerpt from 1889 New South Wales colonial election § Goulburn

1887
This section is an excerpt from 1887 New South Wales colonial election § Goulburn

1885
This section is an excerpt from 1885 New South Wales colonial election § Goulburn

1882
This section is an excerpt from 1882 New South Wales colonial election § Goulburn

1880
This section is an excerpt from 1880 New South Wales colonial election § Goulburn

Elections in the 1870s

1877
This section is an excerpt from 1877 New South Wales colonial election § Goulburn

1874
This section is an excerpt from 1874-75 New South Wales colonial election § Goulburn

1872
This section is an excerpt from 1872 New South Wales colonial election § Goulburn

Elections in the 1860s

1869
This section is an excerpt from 1869-70 New South Wales colonial election § Goulburn

1864
This section is an excerpt from 1864–65 New South Wales colonial election § Goulburn

1861 by-election

1860
This section is an excerpt from 1860 New South Wales colonial election § Goulburn

Elections in the 1850s

1859
This section is an excerpt from 1859 New South Wales colonial election § Goulburn

Notes

References

New South Wales state electoral results by district